Rebholz Nunatak is an isolated nunatak just north of the Hudson Mountains, located 8 nautical miles (15 km) north-northwest of Teeters Nunatak. Mapped by United States Geological Survey (USGS) from ground surveys and U.S. Navy air photos, 1960–66. Named by Advisory Committee on Antarctic Names (US-ACAN) for Maj. Edward Rebholz, operations officer of the U.S. Army Aviation Detachment which supported the Ellsworth Land Survey, 1968–69.
 

Hudson Mountains
Nunataks of Ellsworth Land